Heinz Stübig (12 June 1939 – 7 April 2021) was a German pedagogue.

Life 
Born in Braunschweig, Stübig studied German studies, history and educational science at the Philipps-Universität Marburg and the University of Hamburg from 1960 to 1966, after which he was a research assistant (most recently Academic Superintendent) at the Marburg Research Centre for comparative education. Die pädagogisch-politischen Motive der preußischen Heeresreform 1807–1814. His Habilitation followed in 1982.

Later he worked at the Institute for Educational Science and the Institute for School Pedagogy. He was first Privatdozent, then außerplanmäßiger Professor for Educational Science; his work focused on Comparative Education and Historical Pedagogy. He retired in 2004. He published numerous books.

Writings

Monographs 
 Armee und Nation. Die pädagogisch-politischen Motive der preußischen Heeresreform 1807–1814. (Europäische Hochschulschriften. Reihe 11, Pädagogik. Vol. 5). Peter Lang, Frankfurt, 1971.
 Vergleichende Daten und Analysen zur Bildungspolitik in England. (Marburger Beiträge zur vergleichenden Erziehungswissenschaft und Bildungsforschung. Vol. 7). Minerva-Publikation, Munich 1980, .
 Pädagogik und Politik in der preussischen Reformzeit. Studien zur Nationalerziehung und Pestalozzi-Rezeption (Studien und Dokumentationen zur deutschen Bildungsgeschichte. Vol. 21). Beltz, Weinheim among others 1982, .
 Aspekte der englischen Sekundarschulreform. Leistungsdifferenzierung, Fächerangebot und Curriculumplanung. (Texte - Dokumente - Berichte zum Bildungswesen ausgewählter Industriestaaten. Issue 32). Minerva-Publikation, Munich 1983, .
 Scharnhorst. Die Reform des preussischen Heeres (Persönlichkeit und Geschichte. Vol. 131). Muster-Schmidt, Göttingen among others 1988, .
 Bildungspolitik in England (1975–1985). Vergleichende Daten und Analysen (Marburger Beiträge zur vergleichenden Erziehungswissenschaft und Bildungsforschung. Band 22). Minerva-Publikation, Munich 1989, .
 Bildung, Militär und Gesellschaft in Deutschland. Studien zur Entwicklung im 19. Jahrhundert (Studien und Dokumentationen zur deutschen Bildungsgeschichte. Vol. 54). Böhlau, Cologne among others 1994, .
 Nationalerziehung. Pädagogische Antworten auf die "deutsche Frage" im 19. Jahrhundert. Wochenschau-Verlag, Schwalbach 2006, .
 Gerhard von Scharnhorst. Preußischer General und Heeresreformer. Studien zu seiner Biographie und Rezeption (Geschichte, Forschung und Wissenschaft. Vol. 34). Lit, Berlin among others 2009, .
 Friedrich Wilhelm August Fröbel. Beiträge zur Biographie und Wirkungsgeschichte eines "verdienten deutschen Pädagogen". Projektverlag, Bochum 2010, .
 Zwischen Reformzeit und Reichsgründung. Studien zur Entwicklung der preußisch-deutschen Armee im 19. Jahrhundert. Berliner Wissenschafts-Verlag, Berlin 2012, .
 Mars und Minerva. Militär und Bildung in Deutschland seit dem ausgehenden 18. Jahrhundert. Gesammelte Beiträge. Tectum, Marburg 2015, .

Publications 
 with Wilfried Hendricks: Zwischen Theorie und Praxis. Marburger Kolloquium zur Didaktik. Kronberg: Athenäum 1977, .
 Bibliographie Wolfgang Klafki. Verzeichnis der Veröffentlichungen und betreuten Hochschulschriften 1952–1992. Edited by Madeleine A. Kinsella, Weinheim among others: Beltz 1992, .
 with Peter Baumgart, : Die preußische Armee zwischen Ancien Régime und Reichsgründung. Paderborn among others: Schöningh 2008, .
 with Christian Ritzi: Wolfgang Klafki. Kategoriale Bildung. Konzeption und Praxis reformpädagogischer Schularbeit zwischen 1948 und 1952. Bad Heilbrunn: Klinkhardt 2013, .
Marburger Sommervorlesungen 1981/1982/1983 mit Quellentexten. Marburg: Tectum 2014, .
 with Karl-Heinz Braun und Frauke Stübig: Erziehungswissenschaftliches Denken und pädagogisch-politisches Engagement. Wolfgang Klafki weiterdenken. Wiesbaden: Springer VS 2018, .
 with Karl-Heinz Braun und Frauke Stübig: Wolfgang Klafki: Allgemeine Erziehungswissenschaft. Systematische und historische Abhandlungen. Wiesbaden: Springer VS 2019, .
 with Karl-Heinz Braun and Frauke Stübig: Wolfgang Klafki: Pädagogisch-politische Porträts. Wiesbaden: Springer VS 2019, .

References

External links 
 
 "Heinz Stübig" in the Deutsche Digitale Bibliothek

1939 births
2021 deaths
Writers from Braunschweig
German educators
20th-century German non-fiction writers
Academic staff of the University of Marburg
German male non-fiction writers